Bullant may refer to:

 Jean Bullant, the French architect and sculptor.
 Antoine Bullant, (sometimes Bulant) an 18th-century Czech composer and musician that lived in France and Russia
 Myrmecia (ant), commonly known as the bull ant. 
 Joey Walker, A musician also known by the name Bullant.